The 4 arrondissements of the Maine-et-Loire department are:
 Arrondissement of Angers, (prefecture of the Maine-et-Loire department: Angers) with 66 communes. The population of the arrondissement was 380,215 in 2016.  
 Arrondissement of Cholet, (subprefecture: Cholet) with 32 communes.  The population of the arrondissement was 224,581 in 2016.  
 Arrondissement of Saumur, (subprefecture: Saumur) with 52 communes. The population of the arrondissement was 135,333 in 2016.  
 Arrondissement of Segré, (subprefecture: Segré) with 27 communes. The population of the arrondissement was 70,805 in 2016.

History

In 1800 the arrondissements of Angers, Baugé, Beaupréau, Saumur and Segré were established. In 1857 Cholet replaced Beaupréau as subprefecture. The arrondissement of Baugé was disbanded in 1926.

The borders of the arrondissements of Maine-et-Loire were modified in January 2017:
 four communes from the arrondissement of Angers to the arrondissement of Saumur
 four communes from the arrondissement of Angers to the arrondissement of Segré
 two communes from the arrondissement of Saumur to the arrondissement of Angers
 nine communes from the arrondissement of Saumur to the arrondissement of Cholet

References

Maine-et-Loire